The Now and Then Show was a television show based in Mendocino, California which ran from 1985 to 1987 and still appears in reruns. It was a mix of talk show and sketch comedy hosted by Odd Bob Avery.

Notable guests included the band Tommy Tutone, artist Larry Fuentes, and musician Joel Scott Hill.

External links
 The Now and Then Show on YouTube

1980s American sketch comedy television series
1980s American television talk shows
Mendocino County, California